Charles Leyfield (30 October 1911 – 1 April 1982) was an English professional footballer who played as an outside forward in the Football League for Everton, Sheffield United and Doncaster Rovers. After his retirement, he worked as a trainer for Wrexham, Wales, Everton and scouted for Preston North End and Tranmere Rovers.

Personal life 
Before becoming a professional footballer, Leyfield worked as a joiner. He served in the Royal Artillery during the Second World War. After leaving football, Leyfield ran pubs in Saltney and Guilden Sutton. He died of a heart attack in 1982, aged 70.

Career statistics

Honours 

 Chester & Wirral Football League Hall of Fame

References 

English footballers
English Football League players
Brentford F.C. wartime guest players
1911 births
1982 deaths
Military personnel from Chester
Sportspeople from Chester
Association football outside forwards
Everton F.C. players
Sheffield United F.C. players
Doncaster Rovers F.C. players
Fulham F.C. wartime guest players
Chester City F.C. wartime guest players
Wrexham A.F.C. non-playing staff
Wales national football team non-playing staff
Everton F.C. non-playing staff
Preston North End F.C. non-playing staff
Tranmere Rovers F.C. non-playing staff
English Football League representative players
English carpenters
British Army personnel of World War II
Royal Artillery personnel
20th-century British businesspeople